Udegola is a village in the Siraguppa taluk of Bellary district in Karnataka state, India.

Demographics
Per the 2011 Census of India, Udegolam has a total population of 1523; of whom 761 are male and 762 female.

Importance
Udegolam is famous for the minor edict of the emperor Ashoka found in the village.

See also
Maski
Nittur, Siruguppa
Nadivi
Siraguppa
Tekkalakote
Bellary

References

Villages in Bellary district
History of Karnataka
Archaeological sites in Karnataka